Kreuzberg Saddle is a high mountain pass across the Gailtal Alps in the Austrian state of Carinthia.

The road runs beneath the Reißkofel massif in the west; to the east, a branch-off leads to Lake Weissensee.

See also
 List of highest paved roads in Europe
 List of mountain passes

Mountain passes of Carinthia (state)
Mountain passes of the Alps
Gailtal Alps